Flury is a surname. Notable people with the surname include:

Alfred Flury (born 1914), Swiss boxer
Jacques Flury (1932–1965), Swiss weightlifter
Jasmine Flury (born 1993), Swiss alpine skier
Pat Flury (born 1973), American baseball player
 (born 1941), Swiss musician

See also 
Flury Koch (born 1945), Swiss cross-country skier